Katherine Elizabeth Morton, better known as Elsie K. Morton (5 October 1885 – 21 August 1968), was a New Zealand journalist and writer. She was born in Devonport, Auckland, New Zealand.

See also
 Kermadec Islands#History
”A Fence Around the Cuckoo”, Ruth Park (autobiography). Viking, 1992.

References

1885 births
1968 deaths
New Zealand women journalists
20th-century New Zealand women writers
20th-century New Zealand journalists
20th-century New Zealand writers